Micha Brumlik (born 1947 in Davos, Switzerland) is professor of education at the Goethe University of Frankfurt am Main, Germany. From October 2000 to 2005 he was director of the Fritz Bauer Institute for the Study and Documentation of the History of the Holocaust.

Books (selection)
 Die Gnostiker : der Traum von der Selbsterlősung der Menschen (1992) (German)
 Schrift, Wort, Ikone Wege aus dem Bilderverbot (1994) (German)
 Kein Weg als Deutscher und Jude Eine bundesrepublikanische Erfahrung (1996) (German)
 Vernunft und Offenbarung Religionsphilosophische Versuche (2000) (German)
 Deutscher Geist und Judenhaß Das Verhältnis des philosophischen Idealismus zum Judentum (2000) (German)
 Bildung und Glück Versuch einer Theorie der Tugenden (2002) (German)
 Aus Katastrophen lernen Grundlagen zeitgeschichtlicher Bildung in menschenrechtlicher Absicht (2004) (German)
 Wer Sturm sät. Die Vertreibung der Deutschen (2005) (German)
 Sigmund Freud Der Denker des 20 Jahrhunderts (2006)

External links

 Brumlik's entry with Goethe University 

1947 births
Living people